Nothaphoebe condensa is a species of plant in the family Lauraceae. It is endemic to Peninsular Malaysia.

References

condensa
Endemic flora of Peninsular Malaysia
Vulnerable plants
Taxonomy articles created by Polbot